Kousek nebe ("A Piece of Heaven") is a 2005 Czech romance film directed by Petr Nikolaev.

Plot
The film, set in a Czechoslovak prison in the 1950s, focuses on the romantic relationship between two unjustly sentenced inmates, Luboš and Dana, as they try to survive under hard prison conditions.

Cast
 Jakub Doubrava - Lubos
 Tatiana Pauhofová - Dana (as Tána Pauhofová)
 Petr Forman - Bruno
 Ondřej Vetchý - Rusnák
 Pavel Zednícek - Roubal
 Vladimír Javorský - Sebek
 Karel Zima - Dráb
 Zuzana Stivínová - Dorota
 Lenka Vychodilová - Kredenc
 Josef Somr - Prisoner
 Petr Vacek - Prisoner
 Pavel Landovský - Starej
 Jan Vondráček - Warder

Reception
Kousek nebe received positive reviews, and was nominated for five Czech Lion awards.

References

External links
 

2005 films
2000s romance films
Czech romantic films
2000s Czech-language films
2000s Czech films